Sky Cops is a British documentary series broadcast on BBC One revealing the work of the air police in the UK. The show, which was first broadcast from 2006 to 2008, follows police helicopters from the South Yorkshire Air Operations Unit and the Metropolitan Police Air Support Unit.

Pilots
 Captain Doug Hale - South Yorkshire Police
 Captain Chris Daly - Metropolitan Police

Episodes

Series overview

Series 1 (2006)

Series 2 (2008)

Series 3 (2008)

See also
 Traffic Cops - sister series broadcast on Channel 5.
 Motorway Cops - sister series broadcast on BBC One.
 Helicopter Heroes - series broadcast on BBC One following the Yorkshire Air Ambulance. 
 Police Interceptors - series broadcast on Channel 5 with a similar format.
 Brit Cops - police documentary series originally on Bravo and now on Sky Livingit.
 Road Wars - programme broadcast on Sky1, Sky2, and Pick TV which is about Road Traffic Police.
 Street Wars - programme broadcast on Sky about police officers "on the beat".
 Police Camera Action! - series broadcast on ITV with a similar format.

References

External links

2000s British crime television series
2006 British television series debuts
2008 British television series endings
BBC television documentaries
Documentary television series about aviation
Documentary television series about policing
Police aviation units of the United Kingdom
Television shows set in London
Television shows set in South Yorkshire